The Federal Building and U.S. Courthouse is a historic building in Gainesville, Georgia, located at 126 Washington Street. It was added to the National Register of Historic Places on January 24, 1974. Part of the building was constructed in 1910 and used as a post office. James Knox Taylor designed it. The courthouse was constructed behind this building in 1936. The post office building is marble and both buildings are Neoclassical designs.

See also
 Hall County Courthouse (Gainesville, Georgia)
 National Register of Historic Places listings in Hall County, Georgia

References

External links
 The Federal Courthouse in Gainesville, Georgia

Courthouses in Georgia (U.S. state)
Federal buildings in the United States
Courthouses on the National Register of Historic Places in Georgia (U.S. state)
Buildings and structures in Hall County, Georgia
Government buildings completed in 1910
Government buildings completed in 1936
Neoclassical architecture in Georgia (U.S. state)
Gainesville, Georgia
National Register of Historic Places in Hall County, Georgia
1910 establishments in Georgia (U.S. state)